Heli Tuulikki Paasio (born November 24, 1972 in Turku) is a Finnish politician from Turku. A Social Democrat, she was member of the Parliament of Finland for Finland Proper from 1999 to 2015.

Paasio is daughter of Pertti Paasio and granddaughter of Rafael Paasio who were both prominent Social Democratic politicians. She graduated as Master of Philosophy (mathematics teacher) in 1999. She was elected to the Parliament four times. In the 2011 election she received 13,945 votes, the most in Finland Proper and the eight-most in the entire Finland. After a parliamentary career of sixteen years, she retired from the Parliament in 2015.

References

External links 
 

1972 births
Living people
People from Turku
Social Democratic Party of Finland politicians
Members of the Parliament of Finland (1999–2003)
Members of the Parliament of Finland (2003–07)
Members of the Parliament of Finland (2007–11)
Members of the Parliament of Finland (2011–15)